The Philosopher's Zone is a weekly ABC Radio National radio discussion series exploring philosophical issues.

References

External links

2005 radio programme debuts
Audio podcasts
ABC radio programs
Philosophy podcasts
Philosophy radio programs